David Donald Kpormakpor (28 September 1935 – 19 August 2010) was a Liberian politician and the first chairman of the Council of State that ruled Liberia from 7 March 1994 until 1 September 1995 during the height of the First Liberian Civil War.

Born in Bomi County, Kpormakpor graduated from the Louis Arthur Grimes School of Law of the University of Liberia. He later served as an associate justice on the Supreme Court of Liberia. 

During the civil war, Kpormakpor was chosen as the civilian chair of the Council of State, which also included members representing warring factions in an attempt to end the war. Following a year of political stalemate, Kpormakpor and the Council of State disbanded and were succeeded by another council headed by Wilton Sankawulo.

Kpormakpor later moved to the United States, residing on Staten Island. He died in New York City in 2010. A high-powered Liberian Government delegation headed Cllr. Philip A. Z. Banks, II, Chairman of the Law Reform Commission, and Former Minister of the Ministry of Justice attended l the Funeral of Honorable. David D. Kpormakpor, Former Chairman of the Liberia National Transitional Government (LNTG) in he United States of America.

References

Members of the Council of State
1944 births
Liberian expatriates in the United States
2010 deaths
People from Bomi County
University of Liberia alumni
Supreme Court of Liberia justices
20th-century Liberian politicians